Vladimir Canjuga (born 3 April 1960) is a Croatian handball coach. He coaches the Croatia women's national handball team, and participated at the 2011 World Women's Handball Championship in Brazil, and at the 2014 European Women's Handball Championship.

References

1960 births
Living people
Croatian handball coaches